Prechistaya Gora is a rural locality (a selo) in Nebylovskoye Rural Settlement, Yuryev-Polsky District, Vladimir Oblast, Russia. The population was 30 as of 2010.

Geography 
Prechistaya Gora is located on the Toma River, 35 km southeast of Yuryev-Polsky (the district's administrative centre) by road. Krasoye Zarechye is the nearest rural locality.

References 

Rural localities in Yuryev-Polsky District